Community Alliance for Jewish-affiliated Cemeteries (CAJAC) is a nonprofit organization established to rescue and maintain Jewish cemeteries.  CAJAC's mission is to be a central repository for fundraising, endowment management and the general care of abandoned and at-risk Jewish cemeteries.

History
The organization was incorporated as Friends of Bayside Cemetery on September 22, 2006. It officially changed its name to Community Association for Jewish At-risk Cemeteries on April 13, 2007. The organization officially changed its name again to Community Alliance for Jewish-affiliated Cemeteries on August 11, 2014.

Bayside Cemetery restoration
Starting with seed money from the UJA Federation of New York, CAJAC has begun a massive restoration and maintenance program at Bayside Cemetery in Queens, New York.  CAJAC has employed a private contractor and instituted a volunteer program to clear the entire cemetery.

References

External links
Bayside Cemetery Cleanup Begins by CAJAC - The Community Association for Jewish At-risk Cemeteries
Official Site of the Hebrew Free Burial Association
CAJAC Facebook Page

Organizations established in 2006
Charities based in New York (state)
Jewish charities based in the United States